The Bar Standards Board regulates barristers in England and Wales for the public interest.
It is responsible for:

 Setting standards of conduct for barristers and authorising barristers to practise;
 Monitoring the service provided by barristers to assure quality;
 Setting the education and training requirements for becoming a barrister as well as setting continuing training requirements to ensure that barristers’ skills are maintained throughout their careers; and
 Handling complaints against barristers and taking enforcement or other action where appropriate

The BSB's functions were originally carried out by the General Council of the Bar, the barristers' representative body, until 2006 when the Bar Council created the BSB as an independent regulator. The Legal Services Board has once - in 2013 - questioned the independence of the BSB from the Bar Council.

The BSB's governing board meets monthly at its headquarters in High Holborn, London, and holds public and private sessions. It has a majority of lay (non-barrister) members and the remainder are barristers. Its chair is Kathryn Stone OBE. The vice-chair is Andrew Mitchell KC. since January 2021. He replaced Naomi Ellenbogen KC who was appointed to the High Court on 2 November 2020.

Members of the BSB's board as of December 2019 are:

Barrister Members:
Andrew Mitchell KC, Leslie Thomas KC,
Elizabeth Prochaska,
Adam Solomon KC and
Irena Sabic.

Lay Members:
Alison Allden OBE,
Steven Haines,
Emir Feisal,
Kathryn Stone OBE, and
Stephen Thornton CBE.

BSB Entities and Alternative Business Structures
The Bar Standards Board also authorise and regulate "BSB entities", which fall into two distinct bodies: BSB authorised bodies (previously referred to as "entities") are fully owned and managed by authorised, such as lawyers with a current practising certificate. BSB licensed bodies (also known as "Alternative Business Structures" or ABSs), however, are owned and managed jointly by both authorised and non-authorised individuals. The Bar Standards Board held a workshop at the 2016 Annual Bar Conference, and authorised the first three Licensed Bodies in April 2017, including VII Law, Minerva Law and ShenSmith Law. Licensed bodies have been reported by Thomson Reuters as a leading innovation of the legal industry.

See also 
 Barristers in England and Wales

References

External links
 

Bar of England and Wales
English law
Legal ethics
Self-regulatory organisations in the United Kingdom
Legal regulators of the United Kingdom
Law enforcement in Wales